Auditorio may refer to:

 Auditorio light rail station, in Guadalajara, Jalisco
 Auditorio metro station, in Mexico City
 Auditorio (Mexico City Metrobús)

See also 
 Auditorio Nacional (disambiguation)